Football at the South American Games is the football tournament of the South American Games (also known as "Juegos Odesur"). Olympic/youth teams from South America have participated in it throughout its history. 

During the first 2 editions (1978 and 1982) they were known as the Cruz del Sur Games, between 1998 and 2006 the football tournament was not played, instead a futsal tournament was organized.

In the first edition (1978) U-20 teams participated, while in the following ones (1982 and 1986) U-19 teams participated, for the 1990 tournament, the football section was played by U-20 teams preparing to the 1991 South American championship. Two editions of the tournament were played with Sub-17 national teams, returning to U-20 teams in 2018. 

In 2014, a women's tournament was included.

Eligible participants

Men's tournament

Results 

Notes

Historical medals

Women's tournament

Results

References 

 

 
Sports at the South American Games
South
South American Games